Huntington High School is a high school located in the Pines Road area of West Shreveport, Louisiana 71129 United States. It is a part of Caddo Public Schools.

Athletics
Huntington High athletics competes in the LHSAA.

Notable alumni
Albert Belle, MLB player
Kenny Davidson, NFL player
Troy Edwards, NFL player
Hurricane Chris (rapper) 
Thomas McLemore, NFL player
Michael Qualls, professional basketball player

References

External links
 Huntington High School

Shreveport, Louisiana
High schools in Shreveport, Louisiana
Schools in Caddo Parish, Louisiana
Public middle schools in Louisiana
Public high schools in Louisiana